Senhor Roubado station is part of the Yellow Line of the Lisbon Metro.

History
It opened on March 27, 2004, in conjunction with the Odivelas, Ameixoeira, Lumiar and Quinta das Conchas stations, and it is located on Rua do Senhor Roubado. Rather than serving a residential neighbourhood, it is located close to the junction of the N8, A8 and A36 highways, and operates as a park and ride interchange station.

The architectural design of the station is by Manuel Bastos.

Connections

Urban buses

Carris 
 206 Cais do Sodré ⇄ Senhor Roubado (dawn service)
 736 Cais do Sodré ⇄ Odivelas (Bairro Dr. Lima Pimentel)

Suburban buses

Rodoviária de Lisboa 
 004 Senhor Roubado (Metro) ⇄ Casal do Bispo
 201 Lisboa (Campo Grande) ⇄ Caneças (Escola Secundária)
 202 Senhor Roubado (Metro) ⇄ Montemor
 205 Pontinha (Metro) ⇄ Senhor Roubado (Metro) via Serra da Luz
 213 Senhor Roubado (Metro) ⇄ Caneças (Escola Secundária) via Vale do Forno
 216 Senhor Roubado (Metro) - Circulação via Casal Novo
 226 Senhor Roubado (Metro) ⇄ Arroja

See also
 List of Lisbon metro stations

References

External links

Yellow Line (Lisbon Metro) stations
Railway stations opened in 2004